

This is a list of the National Register of Historic Places listings in Washington County, Vermont.

This is intended to be a complete list of the properties and districts on the National Register of Historic Places in Washington County, Vermont, United States. Latitude and longitude coordinates are provided for many National Register properties and districts; these locations may be seen together in a map.

There are 70 properties and districts listed on the National Register in the county, including 2 National Historic Landmarks.

Current listings

|}

See also

 List of National Historic Landmarks in Vermont
 National Register of Historic Places listings in Vermont

References

Washington